Gertjan Rothman (born 23 August 1983) is a Dutch former professional footballer who played as a defender or midfielder for Excelsior Rotterdam and VV Capelle.

References

External links
 

1983 births
Living people
Dutch footballers
Footballers from Gouda, South Holland
Association football midfielders
Association football defenders
Eredivisie players
Eerste Divisie players
Excelsior Rotterdam players
VV Capelle players